King Saud bin Abdul Aziz Sports City is a multi-use Saudi sports facility which is located in the city of Al-Bahah.

Description
It was opened in 1989. The facility had a sports stadium with a 10,000 seat, an indoor pool, a multi-purpose indoor hall and training grounds.

See also
 List of things named after Saudi Kings

References

External links
 Stadium information

Football venues in Saudi Arabia
1989 establishments in Saudi Arabia
Multi-purpose stadiums in Saudi Arabia